Palaeohatteriidae is an extinct family of basal sphenacodonts known from the Early Permian period (Asselian-Sakmarian stages) of Saxony, Germany. Two genera are known: Palaeohatteria and Pantelosaurus.

Classification
The cladogram below shows the phylogenetic positions of Palaeohatteria and Pantelosaurus phylogenetic position among other sphenacodonts following Fröbisch et al. (2011).

Spindler (2016) utilized use of the name Palaeohatteriidae for the clade comprising Palaeohatteria and Pantelosaurus but not Ianthodon.

References 

Prehistoric sphenacodonts
Prehistoric synapsid families
Cisuralian synapsids of Europe
Taxa named by Georg Baur